Serdar Avcı (born July 1, 1985) is a Turkish boxer in the bantamweight (54 kg) discipline. He started boxing at Istanbul Fenerbahçe Boxing Club.

He failed to qualify for the 2004 Summer Olympics after ending up in third place at the 4th AIBA European 2004 Olympic Qualifying Tournament in Baku, Azerbaijan. Avcı participated at the 2005 Mediterranean Games in Almería, Spain and won bronze medal.

He was shown the honorary world championship by defeating Albert Selimov, the European and world champion in amateur boxing, at the world championship
He also managed to beat career boxers such as Artur Bernetsyan and Leonardo Zappavigna

Serdar Avci Ukraine and Turkey have made national boxing boxer behalf of the National Team is in Turkey.

In his own boxing sports club, he goes to boxing matches and trains new athletes (Kadikoy Boxing Club  )

Serdar Avci respectively before amateur Boxer, matchmaker, pro boxer, promoter and boxing manager

More and updated information (Boxrec  )

Less than two months after winning the Universal Boxing Organization™ (UBO) Inter-Continental title in Kiev, Ukraine, Turkey´s Serdar Avci won the Interim UBO World Heavyweight title on Wednesday, July 14.

In his 12th game, he defeated Danny Williams, who knocked out Mike Tyson.

In his 13th match in Kiev, Ukraine, he faced Indian opponent and knocked him out in the 2nd round. In this fight Serdar Avci won the WBC Asia Silver title.

On the 22nd of October, 2022 in Istanbul,  Serdar Avci defeated the African (ABU) champion Tony Salam, who had a professional record of 16 wins and 3 losses, in a ten round fight. In the second round Serdar Avci won by a technical knockout and became the WBC International Silver champion in the cruiserweight division.

News 

(Hurriyet  )

(Turkboks  )

(Fanatik  )

(Milliyet  )

(CNNTurk  )

(Nebuneo  )

(Sondakika  )

(Milliyet  )

(Fanatik  )

(Hurriyet  )

(Acunn  )

(CNNTurk  )

(FOTOMAC  )

(Milliyet  )

(Hurriyet  )

(Son Dakika  )

(Aspor  )

(Sözcü  )

Career 

2021-07-14 Taryel Jafarov   / TKO vacant Universal Boxing Organization World (UBO) World Heavyweight Championship( UBO  )  
2021-05-19 Zaal Kvezereli   / TKO vacant Universal Boxing Organization (UBO) Inter Continental Heavy Title

References 

1985 births
Living people
Turkish male boxers
Bantamweight boxers
Mediterranean Games bronze medalists for Turkey
Competitors at the 2005 Mediterranean Games
Mediterranean Games medalists in boxing
Fenerbahçe boxers
21st-century Turkish people